Albert Hoffman (1915–1993) was an American painter and wood carver. Never progressing beyond a sixth-grade education, Hoffman earned his living operating a junkyard in Galloway Township, New Jersey, near Atlantic City. A self-taught artist, he found inspiration in narratives from the Torah and Nevi'im; over his lifetime he produced over 250 carvings whose subjects were drawn from the Bible or from his Jewish background. His works are also a mirror of his personal interests: whaling, horse racing, and Native Americans all found places in his paintings.

He produced three different types of carvings, bas reliefs, columnar reliefs, and compositional groups. His art is considered outsider art.

Though he sold some of his works and also did some carving for local synagogues, he created most of his art for himself. Nonetheless, he exhibited his work locally, where it won top prizes. His work has been shown across the eastern United States and a number of American museums hold public collections, including the American Folk Art Museum, the Abby Aldrich Rockefeller Folk Art Museum, and the Noyes Museum of Art.

References

External links
Jewish Folk Artists of Our Time
The Noyes Museum of Art
Andrew Edlin Gallery
"Fear Not" - a sample of Hoffman's work
"Fear Not: Al Hoffman's Folk Art" (The Jewish Press)

20th-century American painters
American male painters
1915 births
1993 deaths
American woodcarvers
Artists from New Jersey
Folk artists
Jewish American artists
People from Galloway Township, New Jersey
20th-century American Jews
20th-century American male artists